Chavareh may refer to:
 Chavareh, Gilan